San Juan de Tantaranche District is one of thirty-two districts of the province Huarochirí in Peru.

See also 
 Waqaypaka

References